This is a list of universities in Poland. In total, there are approximately 457 universities and collegiate-level institutions of higher education in Poland, including 131 government-funded and 326 privately owned universities, with almost 2 million enrolled students . According to the March 18, 2011 Act of the Polish Parliament, the universities are divided into categories based on their legal status and level of authorization.

There are forty publicly funded and two private universities considered classical, granting doctoral degrees on top of bachelor's and master's degrees in at least ten fields of knowledge. The remaining universities are divided according to their educational profile usually reflected in their differing names. Academy is used for institutions which focus on fine arts, music and drama. The technical universities specialize in engineering and the physical sciences. (The name refers to the subjects taught; they are not technical schools.)

In total, there are 24 cities in Poland, with between one and eight state-funded universities each. Among the top are Warsaw, Kraków, Poznań, and Wrocław. The Polish names of listed universities are given in brackets, followed by a standard abbreviation (if commonly used or if existent). Note that some of the institutions might choose to translate their own name as university in English, even if they do not officially have the Polish-language equivalent name of uniwersytet.

Public universities
Please use table sort buttons for year of establishment in chronological order and alphabetical list of locations

Technical universities 
 AGH University of Science and Technology in Kraków (Akademia Górniczo-Hutnicza, AGH)
 University of Bielsko-Biała (Akademia Techniczno-Humanistyczna w Bielsku-Białej, ATH) 
 Białystok Technical University (Politechnika Białostocka, PB) 
 Częstochowa University of Technology (Politechnika Częstochowska, PCz) 
 Gdańsk University of Technology (Politechnika Gdańska, PG) 
 Silesian University of Technology in Gliwice (Politechnika Śląska w Gliwicach, PŚl or Pol.Śl.) 
 Kielce University of Technology (Politechnika Świętokrzyska, PSK)
 Koszalin University of Technology (Politechnika Koszalińska, PK) 
 Lublin University of Technology (Politechnika Lubelska, PL) 
 Łódź University of Technology (Politechnika Łódzka, PŁ)
 Opole University of Technology (Politechnika Opolska, PO) 
 Poznań University of Technology (Politechnika Poznańska, PP)
 Kazimierz Pułaski University of Technology and Humanities in Radom (Uniwersytet Technologiczno-Humanistyczny im. Kazimierza Pułaskiego w Radomiu, UTH) 
 Rzeszów University of Technology (Politechnika Rzeszowska, PRz) 
 Tadeusz Kościuszko University of Technology (Politechnika Krakowska, PK) 
 West Pomeranian University of Technology (Zachodniopomorski Uniwersytet Technologiczny w Szczecinie, ZUT)
 Warsaw University of Technology (Politechnika Warszawska, PW) 
 Wrocław University of Technology (Politechnika Wrocławska, PWr)

Business schools
 University of Economics in Katowice (Uniwersytet Ekonomiczny w Katowicach)
 Cracow University of Economics (Uniwersytet Ekonomiczny w Krakowie)
 Poznań University of Economics and Business (Uniwersytet Ekonomiczny w Poznaniu) 
 Wrocław University of Economics (Uniwersytet Ekonomiczny we Wrocławiu)
 Warsaw School of Economics (Szkoła Główna Handlowa, SGH)

Teacher universities 
 Academy of Special Education in Warsaw (Akademia Pedagogiki Specjalnej im. Marii Grzegorzewskiej w Warszawie) 
 Jan Długosz University  (Akademia im. Jana Długosza w Częstochowie) 
 Pedagogical University of Cracow (Uniwersytet Pedagogiczny im. K.E.N. w Krakowie) 
 Pomeranian Academy in Słupsk (Akademia Pomorska w Słupsku)

Life sciences 
 University of Technology and Life Sciences in Bydgoszcz (Uniwersytet Technologiczno-Przyrodniczy w Bydgoszczy, UTP) 
 Agricultural University of Kraków (Uniwersytet Rolniczy w Krakowie) 
 University of Life Sciences in Lublin (Uniwersytet Przyrodniczy w Lublinie) 
 University of Life Sciences in Poznań (Uniwersytet Przyrodniczy w Poznaniu)
 University of Natural Sciences and Humanities in Siedlce (Uniwersytet Przyrodniczo-Humanistyczny w Siedlcach) 
 Warsaw University of Life Sciences (Szkoła Główna Gospodarstwa Wiejskiego, SGGW)
 Wroclaw University of Environmental and Life Sciences (Uniwersytet Przyrodniczy we Wrocławiu)

Colleges of physical education
 Józef Piłsudski University of Physical Education in Warsaw
Gdańsk University of Physical Education and Sport (Akademia Wychowania Fizycznego i Sportu im. Jędrzeja Śniadeckieg)

Specialist universities

Medical universities and colleges 

 Jagiellonian University Medical College (Collegium Medicum Uniwersytetu Jagiellońskiego)
 Medical University of Białystok (Uniwersytet Medyczny w Białymstoku)
Collegium Medicum in Bydgoszcz of the Nicolaus Copernicus University of Toruń (Collegium Medicum w Bydgoszczy Uniwersytetu Mikołaja Kopernika w Toruniu)
 Medical University of Gdańsk (Gdański Uniwersytet Medyczny) 
 Medical University of Silesia in Katowice (Śląski Uniwersytet Medyczny w Katowicach)
 Medical University of Lublin (Uniwersytet Medyczny w Lublinie)
 Medical University of Łódź (Uniwersytet Medyczny w Łodzi)
 Poznań University of Medical Sciences (Uniwersytet Medyczny im. Karola Marcinkowskiego w Poznaniu) 
 Pomeranian Medical University in Szczecin (Pomorski Uniwersytet Medyczny w Szczecinie)
 Medical University of Warsaw (Warszawski Uniwersytet Medyczny, WUM) 
 Wrocław Medical University (Uniwersytet Medyczny we Wrocławiu) 
 Collegium Medicum of the University of Warmia and Mazury in Olsztyn (Collegium Medicum Uniwersytetu Warmińsko-Mazurskiego w Olsztynie)
 Collegium Medicum of the University of Zielona Góra (Collegium Medicum Uniwersytetu Zielonogórskiego)

Universities of economics 
 University of Dąbrowa Górnicza (Wyższa Szkoła Biznesu w Dąbrowie Górniczej, WSB)

Academies of music 
 Bydgoszcz Music Academy - "Feliks Nowowiejski" (Akademia Muzyczna im. Feliksa Nowowiejskiego w Bydgoszczy) 
 Stanisław Moniuszko Academy of Music in Gdańsk (Akademia Muzyczna im. Stanisława Moniuszki w Gdańsku)
 University of Music in Katowice (Akademia Muzyczna w Katowicach)
 Academy of Music in Kraków (Akademia Muzyczna w Krakowie) 
 Academy of Music in Łódź (Akademia Muzyczna im. Grażyny i Kiejstuta Bacewiczów w Łodzi)
 Academy of Music in Poznań (Akademia Muzyczna w Poznaniu) 
 Fryderyk Chopin University of Music in Warsaw (Uniwersytet Muzyczny im. Fryderyka Chopina w Warszawie)
 Karol Lipiński University of Music in Wrocław (Akademia Muzyczna im. Karola Lipińskiego we Wrocławiu)

Academies of theatre and film 
 The Aleksander Zelwerowicz National Academy of Dramatic Art in Warsaw
 Ludwik Solski Academy for the Dramatic Arts in Kraków
 National Film School in Łódź

Academies of fine arts 
 Jan Matejko Academy of Fine Arts in Kraków
 Academy of Fine Arts in Warsaw
 Art Academy of Szczecin 
 Eugeniusz Geppert Academy of Fine Arts in Wrocław
 University of Fine Arts in Poznań
 Academy of Fine Arts in Gdańsk 
 Academy of Fine Arts in Katowice

Universities of social sciences 
 University of Social Sciences and Humanities in Warsaw (SWPS Uniwersytet Humanistycznospołeczny)

Theological universities 
 Pontifical University of John Paul II (Uniwersytet Papieski Jana Pawła II w Krakowie)
 John Paul II Catholic University of Lublin (Katolicki Uniwersytet Lubelski Jana Pawła II, KUL) 
 Pontifical Faculty of Theology in Wrocław (Papieski Wydział Teologiczny we Wrocławiu) 
Cardinal Stefan Wyszyński University in Warsaw (from above) with particular sensitivity to Christian values

Maritime universities 
 Gdynia Maritime University (Akademia Morska w Gdyni)
 Maritime University of Szczecin (Akademia Morska w Szczecinie)

Military universities 
 War Studies University (Akademia Sztuki Wojennej)
 Polish Air Force Academy in Dęblin (Wyższa Szkoła Oficerska Sił Powietrznych) 
 Military University of Technology in Warsaw (Wojskowa Akademia Techniczna im. Jarosława Dąbrowskiego, WAT) 
 Tadeusz Kościuszko Land Forces Military Academy in Wrocław (Wyższa Szkoła Oficerska Wojsk Lądowych im. gen. Tadeusza Kościuszki) 
 Polish Naval Academy in Gdynia (Akademia Marynarki Wojennej)

Former universities and colleges in Poland 
 Lubrański Academy (established in 1518)
 Collegium Hosianum founded in 1565
 Jesuit College in Polotsk
 Akademia Zamojska (1594–1784)
 Politechnika Lwowska, now Lviv Polytechnic in Ukraine
 Wilno University, now Vilnius University in Lithuania
 Lwów University, now Lviv University
 Collegium Nobilium (Warsaw) founded in 1740
 Collegium Nobilium (Jesuit) in Warsaw founded in 1752
 Corps of Cadets (Warsaw), the first state college in the Polish–Lithuanian Commonwealth, 1765
 Jazłowiec College for girls, founded in 1863
 Jesuit College in Khyriv for boys founded in 1886
 Jesuit Collegium in Poznań
 Agricultural University of Szczecin (Akademia Rolnicza w Szczecinie), now part of West Pomeranian University of Technology
 Szczecin University of Technology (Politechnika Szczecińska, PS), now part of West Pomeranian University of Technology
 Wyższa Szkoła Wojenna Academy, 1919, now War Studies University

Private universities 

 Wyższa Szkoła Przedsiębiorczości i Administracji w Lublinie
Wyższa Szkoła Prawa (University of Law)
 Prywatna Wyższa Szkoła Nauk Społecznych
 Collegium Humanum – Warsaw Management University(Collegium Humanum – Szkoła Główna Menedżerska)
https://pl.wikipedia.org/wiki/Mazowiecka_Uczelnia_Medyczna_w_Warszawie

See also 
 Education in Poland
 List of universities and colleges in Kraków
 Open access in Poland
 Underground Education in Poland During World War II
 List of colleges and universities by country

Notes and references

 Official register of educational institutions by type (Wykaz szkół i placówek oświatowych według typów). Centrum Informatyczne Edukacji, 30 September 2016. 

Universities
Poland
Poland
Universities